T'ula T'ulani (Aymara t'ula wood, burning material, the reduplication indicates that there is a group of something, -ni a suffix to indicate ownership, "the one with a lot of wood (or burning material)", also spelled Thola Tholani) is a mountain in the La Paz Department in the Andes of Bolivia which reaches a height of approximately . It is located in the Loayza Province, Malla Municipality, southwest of Turi Turini and northwest of Itapalluni.

References 

Mountains of La Paz Department (Bolivia)